Yan da Cruz Souto (born 5 October 2001), known as Yan Souto, is a Brazilian footballer who plays as a central defender for Goiás.

Club career
Born in Campo Grande, Mato Grosso do Sul, Yan Souto began his career with hometown side União ABC before moving to Londrina in 2018. After leaving in 2021, he returned to his former club, and made his first team debut in the year's Campeonato Sul-Mato-Grossense.

On 11 March, after just five matches, he was presented at Série A side Goiás.

Yan Souto made his top tier debut on 19 June 2022, starting in a 1–0 away loss against Corinthians.

Career statistics

References

External links
Goiás profile 

2001 births
Living people
People from Campo Grande
Brazilian footballers
Association football defenders
Campeonato Brasileiro Série A players
Floresta Esporte Clube players
Goiás Esporte Clube players